Steitzviridae is a family of RNA viruses, which infect prokaryotes.

Taxonomy 
Steitzviridae contains 117 genera:

 Abakapovirus
 Achlievirus
 Adahmuvirus
 Alehxovirus
 Aphenovirus
 Arawsmovirus
 Arctuvirus
 Arpirivirus
 Ashcevirus
 Bahnicevirus
 Belbovirus
 Berdovirus
 Bicehmovirus
 Bidhavirus
 Brikhyavirus
 Cahrlavirus
 Cahtavirus
 Catindovirus
 Cebevirus
 Chlurivirus
 Chorovirus
 Clitovirus
 Cohrdavirus
 Controvirus
 Cunarovirus
 Dohnjavirus
 Endehruvirus
 Eregrovirus
 Erimutivirus
 Fagihovirus
 Fejonovirus
 Ferahgovirus
 Fluruvirus
 Frobavirus
 Fudhoevirus
 Gahmegovirus
 Garnievirus
 Gehrmavirus
 Gernuduvirus
 Gihfavirus
 Gredihovirus
 Gulmivirus
 Hahkesevirus
 Henifovirus
 Hohltdevirus
 Hohrdovirus
 Huhbevirus
 Huohcivirus
 Huylevirus
 Hyjrovirus
 Hylipavirus
 Iwahcevirus
 Jiforsuvirus
 Kecijavirus
 Kecuhnavirus
 Kehruavirus
 Kihsiravirus
 Kinglevirus
 Kyanivirus
 Laimuvirus
 Lazuovirus
 Lehptavirus
 Lihvevirus
 Limaivirus
 Lomnativirus
 Loptevirus
 Luloavirus
 Lygehevirus
 Lyndovirus
 Mahdsavirus
 Mahjnavirus
 Metsavirus
 Milihnovirus
 Minusuvirus
 Mocruvirus
 Molucevirus
 Nehumivirus
 Nihlwovirus
 Ociwvivirus
 Pahspavirus
 Patimovirus
 Pepusduvirus
 Phulihavirus
 Pirifovirus
 Podtsbuvirus
 Pohlodivirus
 Psiaduvirus
 Psouhdivirus
 Puduphavirus
 Pujohnavirus
 Rodtovirus
 Rohsdrivirus
 Sdenfavirus
 Setohruvirus
 Sidiruavirus
 Snuwdevirus
 Sperdavirus
 Stehnavirus
 Suhnsivirus
 Surghavirus
 Tamanovirus
 Tehmuvirus
 Tehnicivirus
 Thehlovirus
 Thyrsuvirus
 Tikiyavirus
 Timirovirus
 Tsuhreavirus
 Tuskovirus
 Tuwendivirus
 Vernevirus
 Vesehyavirus
 Vindevirus
 Weheuvirus
 Widsokivirus
 Yeziwivirus
 Zuysuivirus

References 

Virus families
Riboviria